Alvin Fenner is a Seattle-based trip hop artist and multi-instrumentalist, releasing works under the moniker Neat Beats.

Biography
Fenner's first recordings sprung up in 2004 and were self-released in San Diego. In 2009, he released the EP Science is My Girlfriend which garnered local attention by receiving an ExtraSpecialGood designation in the San Diego City Beat.

In 2011, he released his debut album Cosmic Surgery. Following a move to San Francisco, he released his second LP Sleep Cycles in 2015. His latest release is Alternate Soundtrack to Un Chien Andalou,an EP designed to be listened to in tandem with the film Un Chien Andalou.

Fenner currently lives in Seattle, Washington with his wife.

Discography
Science is My Girlfriend CD-R (self-released, 2009)
Cosmic Surgery 12" LP (Hop Skip Jump, 2011)
Sleep Cycles 12" LP (Hop Skip Jump, 2015)
Alternate Soundtrack to Un Chien Andalou EP (self-released, 2016)

References

1987 births
Living people